The 2023 FIBA Under-19 Basketball World Cup will be the 16th edition of the FIBA Under-19 Basketball World Cup, the biennial international men's youth basketball championship contested by the U19 national teams of the member associations of FIBA. The tournament will be hosted in Debrecen, Hungary, from 24 June to 2 July 2023.

Qualified teams

Draw
The draw took place on 14 March 2023.

Seeding
On 9 March 2023, the pots were announced.

Preliminary round

Group A

Group B

Group C

Group D

Knockout stage

Bracket

5–8th place bracket

9–16th place bracket

13–16th place bracket

Round of 16

9–16th place quarterfinals

Quarterfinals

13–16th place semifinals

9–12th place semifinals

5–8th place semifinals

Semifinals

15th place game

13th place game

Eleventh place game

Ninth place game

Seventh place game

Fifth place game

Third place game

Final

Final standings

References

2023
FIBA Under-19 World Cup
FIBA
FIBA
FIBA Under-19
Sport in Debrecen
FIBA Under-19 Basketball World Cup
FIBA